The third-generation of the Ford F-Series is a series of trucks that were produced by Ford from 1957 until 1960. Following its competitors at Dodge and General Motors, Ford widened the front bodywork to integrate the cab and front fenders together. Going a step further, the F-Series integrated the hood into the bodywork with a clamshell design; the feature would stay part of the F-Series for two decades. Although offered previously, the optional chrome grille was far more prominent than before. In the rear, two types of pickup boxes were offered, starting a new naming convention: the traditional separate-fender box was dubbed "Flareside", while "Styleside" boxes integrated the pickup bed, cab, and front fenders together. As before, Ford still offered a low-GVWR version of each model.

In May 1957, Ford discontinued building trucks at the Highland Park Ford Plant in Highland Park, Michigan. All light and medium trucks were transferred to 10 other plants in the USA. After 1969, heavy-duty trucks (above F-350) and some light duty trucks were transferred to Kentucky Truck Assembly in Louisville, Kentucky. Third generation trucks were built in Brazil as the F-100, F-350, and F-600 from 1962 until 1971, featuring only the 292 cu.in. Y-Block V8.

OHV sixes and V8s were the same ones as used in Ford cars of the era.

This was the last generation of the panel van. Ford would not offer a full-size van again until the 1968 introduction of the second generation E-Series.

Yearly changes

1958
The grille was updated; the dual headlights are replaced by quad headlights (the only generation of the F-Series to use them).

1959
Ford introduced the option of the F-Series in four-wheel drive. Previously a conversion outsourced to Marmon-Herrington, Ford was the first of the "big three" U.S. manufacturers to manufacture four-wheel drive trucks on its own.

Models:
 F-100 (F10, F11, F14): 1/2 ton (4,000–5,000 GVWR max)
 F-100 (F18, F19)(4×4): 1/2 ton (4,000–5,600 GVWR max)
 F-250 (F25, F26): 3/4 ton (4,900–7,400 GVWR max)
 F-250 (F28, F29)(4×4): 3/4 ton (4,900–7,400 GVWR max)
 F-350 (F35, F36): 1 ton (7,700–9,800 GVWR max)

Engines:

Construction in Argentina 
Third generation trucks were built in Argentina from 1959 to 1961 as the F-100 and F-600.

References

3rd generation
Pickup trucks
Rear-wheel-drive vehicles
All-wheel-drive vehicles
Cars introduced in 1956
1960s cars
1970s cars
Motor vehicles manufactured in the United States